"One Man Wrecking Machine" is the fourth song from Guster's 2006 album Ganging Up on the Sun.

The song was included for the soundtrack to the 2007 movie Disturbia, and was played at the closing scene. It was also featured in a second-season episode of NBC series Life.

The puppets used in the song's video directed by Drew Lightfoot are made by Toronto-based Monster Factory.

The song features a theremin, an instrument that uses antennas to gauge proximity and translates proximity to pitch and volume.

Track listings
"One Man Wrecking Machine"
"Days"
"Ruby Falls" (also appears on "Ganging Up on the Sun")
"Two at a Time" (Demo Version)
"Good Feeling" (Live)

Guster songs
2006 singles